Antonia Campbell-Hughes is an actress, writer, director and former fashion designer from Northern Ireland. She is best known for playing Natascha Kampusch in 3096 Days, Marie-Antoinette in Dangerous Liaisons and the titular role in Cordelia.

She first gained notability as a fashion designer while in her teens. After an early career in comedy, she moved on to more serious acting roles, alongside writing for the screen. Her debut feature film as director, the thriller It Is In Us All, was released in 2022.

Early life
Campbell-Hughes was born in Derry, Northern Ireland, living there until the age of two. Until the age of 16 she would move between the United States, Switzerland, Germany, and England. After experimenting with short film, she went to art school in Dublin, and during that time, as a teenager, she started her own fashion label. Her clothing line would sell internationally under her own name, and a diffusion line for high street store Topshop.

Television
Her first role was in Jack Dee's sitcom Lead Balloon, which ran for four series, where she played his daughter. Her early career was mostly in comedy, with roles in a variety of comedy shows on British television, alongside Jennifer Saunders and Alex Macqueen, in Sharon Horgan and Stephen Mangan's early series Free Agents, among others. In 2009, she created her own show, Bluebell Welch, for MTV, where she played an overzealous, obsessive MTV presenter. Alongside her comedy projects, she performed smaller, serious roles in popular UK TV series such as Silent Witness, Casualty, Blackbeard: Terror at Sea and Spooks. She was co-lead in an episode of Channel 4's anthology series Coming Up. Alongside a film career, she took on occasional TV roles, in series such as Lewis, Doll & Em and London Spy. In 2016 she was a series regular on My Mother and Other Strangers. She played Marie Antoniette in the 2022 STARZ series adaption of Dangerous Liaisons.

Film career
Her first notable film role was in the Jane Campion feature film Bright Star,  and her first starring role was the 2011 indie drama Lotus Eaters. This was followed by the lead role in the 2012 film Kelly + Victor, which won the BAFTA Award for Outstanding Debut by a British Writer, Director or Producer that year. The following year she played Natascha Kampusch in 3096 Days. Natascha, an Austrian, was abducted at age 10, and held captive for 8 years, escaping in 2006, a case that made headlines worldwide. Other notable roles followed in movies like Les Cowboys, The Canal and Never Grow Old. She co-starred in the 2022 David Lynch production The Other Me, written and directed by Georgian Giga Agladze.

In 2022 she released her directorial debut It Is In Us All, which she wrote, where she also plays a supporting role. The movie, a thriller, won the  Extraordinary Cinematic Vision award at the SXSW Film Festival and was nominated for the SXSW Grand Jury Award, Narrative Feature. It was nominated for a pair of British Independent Film Awards and was selected for a number of festivals.

Filmography

Film

Television

Awards
 Shooting Stars Award 2012: Antonia received this award at the 62nd Berlin International Film Festival in February 2012, annual acting award for up-and-coming actors by European Film Promotion.

References

External links

 
 

British fashion designers
Date of birth missing (living people)
Living people
Film actresses from Northern Ireland
Stage actresses from Northern Ireland
Place of birth missing (living people)
Television actresses from Northern Ireland
21st-century actresses from Northern Ireland
Year of birth missing (living people)
British women fashion designers